Kevin Drury  (born July 20, 1988) is a Canadian freestyle skier who competes internationally.

Career
He represented Canada at the 2018 Winter Olympics, where he placed 4th in Men's ski cross.

He is the current World Cup Overall champion. Drury competed as an alpine skier for the University of Vermont Catamounts ski team from 2009 to 2014, where he was a two-time All-American selection and national runner-up in the giant slalom at the 2011 NCAA Championships.

References

External links

1988 births
Living people
Canadian male freestyle skiers
Olympic freestyle skiers of Canada
Freestyle skiers at the 2018 Winter Olympics
Freestyle skiers at the 2022 Winter Olympics
University of Vermont alumni
Vermont Catamounts skiers
Skiers from Toronto